Christopher John Guelph Puplick  (born 13 May 1948) is a British-Australian politician, public servant and public intellectual.

Career
From 1975–78, Puplick was the federal president of the Young Liberals.

He was appointed to a casual vacancy in the Senate in July 1978, representing the Liberal Party of Australia, but was defeated at the 1980 election, completing his term in June 1981.  

He was returned to the Senate at the 1984 election. In the 1990 election, the Call to Australia party made the unusual choice of preferencing the Labor Party above the Liberal Party specifically to prevent Puplick's re-election; Puplick was not re-elected and his term finished in June 1990.

After Parliament
After leaving Parliament, Puplick was appointed President of the NSW Anti-Discrimination Board and NSW Privacy Commissioner.

He was appointed a Member of the Order of Australia (AM) in 2001, for contributions to Australian politics and public policy, particularly in relation to human rights and social justice.

Controversy
Puplick resigned his Anti-Discrimination Board and Privacy Commission positions in 2003 following allegations of administrative favouritism involving a personal friend, and a deteriorating relationship with the New South Wales Government.

Memberships, Directorships
 Member, Australia Council Theatre Board
 Member, National Institute of Dramatic Art (NIDA) Board of Directors
 Chair, National Film and Sound Archive Board, 2008–2011
 Chair, Australian National Council on AIDS, Hepatitis C and Related Diseases
 NSW Privacy Commissioner, 1999–2003

Publications
Chris Puplick and R.J. Southey, 1980, Liberal Thinking, Macmillan, Melbourne.
Chris Puplick, 1984, 'Science and Technology', in George Brandis, Tom Harley and Don Markwell (eds), Liberals Face the Future: Essays on Australian Liberalism, Oxford University Press, Melbourne.
John Black, Michael Macklin and Chris Puplick, 1992, ‘How Parliament Works in Practice’, in Parliamentary Perspectives 1991, Papers on Parliament, No. 14, Department of the Senate, February 1992.
Chris Puplick, October 1, 2012, Platform Papers 33: Changing Times at NIDA, Currency Press, .

References

1948 births
Living people
Liberal Party of Australia members of the Parliament of Australia
Members of the Australian Senate
Members of the Australian Senate for New South Wales
People educated at Manly Selective Campus
20th-century Australian politicians
Members of the Order of Australia
English emigrants to Australia
University of Sydney alumni